USS Viking has been the name of more than one United States Navy ship, and may refer to:

 , a converted yacht in commission from May to September 1898 and from September to October 1899
 , a patrol boat in service from 1918 to 1919
 , a rescue and salvage ship commissioned in 1942 and stricken in 1953

See also
 Viking (disambiguation)#Ships

United States Navy ship names